Michelle Yeoh is a Malaysian heiress, socialite, model and fashion influencer.

Early life and family 
Michelle Yeoh is the daughter of Dato' Sri Michael Yeoh and Datin Sri Tina Yeoh. She is a niece of Tan Sri Dato' Francis Yeoh and the granddaughter of billionaire Tan Sri Dato' Seri Yeoh Tiong Lay, the founder of YTL Corporation. She is of Malaysian Chinese ancestry. She is a fraternal twin; her sister is Rachel Yeoh. She is a first cousin of Ruth Yeoh and Rebekah Yeoh.

Yeoh and her sister debuted at the Queen Charlotte's Ball at Kensington Palace in 2015, becoming the first twins and first Malaysians to do so.

Career 
In 2017, she and her sister walked the runway for Dolce & Gabbana's Fall 2017 fashion show in Milan Fashion Week. In August 2017, she was featured on the cover of Vogue Japan along with the other models from the Dolce & Gabbana fashion show. She and her sister were featured in the March 2017 fashion issue of Hong Kong Tatler and on the cover of Malaysia Tatler. In 2018, she walked the runway for Dolce & Gabbana's Alta Moda show.

Yeoh serves alongside her sister on the advisory committee for the British Fashion Council.

References 

Living people
Debutantes
Fashion influencers
Malaysian twins
Malaysian people of Chinese descent
Malaysian female models
Malaysian socialites
People from Kuala Lumpur
Michelle
Malaysian bloggers
Malaysian women bloggers
Year of birth missing (living people)